Mr. T's Commandments is a rap EP for children, released in 1984. In it, Mr. T guides the youth of America with lessons on love, not talking to strangers, honoring parents, doing homework and saying "no" to drug use.

The album's lead single, "Mr. T's Commandment," was released in 1984. It peaked at #75 on the Billboard Hot R&B/Hip Hop Songs chart.

Track listing
"Mr. T's Commandment" - 4:59
"Don't Talk to Strangers" - 5:12
"The Toughest Man in the World" - 3:55
"Mr. T, Mr. T (He Was Made for Love)" - 3:21
"The One and Only Mr. T" - 4:46
"No Dope No Drugs" - 4:36
"You Got to Go Through It" - 4:27

Personnel
Paul Jackson Jr. - Guitar
John Van Tongeren - Keyboards, Linn Drums, Guitar 
Patrick Henderson - Producer, Keyboards  
Afrika Islam - turntables (tracks: 2, 3, 5, 6)  
Ice-T - Rap Direction (tracks 2, 3, 6, 7).  
Howard Smith - Vocals (track 2)
Tata Vega - Vocals (track 4)

References

External links
LISTEN UP! (page 5), a full page Billboard advertisement for Mr. T's Commandments

1984 debut EPs
Mr. T